Le Bonheur (French for "The Happiness") is an album by American singer-songwriter Storm Large. It marks the first release for Large with her newly formed band of the same name.

The album was released on Heinz Records, a record label founded by the band Pink Martini, with whom Large has been performing since 2011.

Le Bonheur contains eleven cover versions and two original songs.

Track listing

* In English and Spanish
** In English and French

a Guest vocals by Holcombe Waller
b Guest vocals by Michael Geier of Puddles Pity Party
c Guest vocals by Sofia, Melanie and Amanda von Trapp of The von Trapps
d Guest vocals by Sofia, Melanie, Amanda and August von Trapp of The von Trapps

Credits and personnel 
Credits adapted from the album's liner notes.

 Storm Large – vocals, producer, arrangements
 James Beaton – piano, arrangements
 Scott Weddle – guitar, arrangements
 Greg Eklund – drums, arrangements
 Matt Brown – bass
 Robert Taylor – producer
 Stephen A. Taylor – orchestrations

 Norman Leyden – orchestrations
 3 Leg Torso – arrangements
 David Friedlander – engineer, mixing
 Bernie Grundman – mastering
 Jim Silke – cover art
 Laura Domela – photography
 Mike King – design, layout

Charts 
Album chart usages for Wallonia

References

External links
 

2014 albums
Storm Large albums
Heinz Records albums